Niels Wellenberg (born 9 August 1982) is a Dutch former professional footballer.

Career
Both comfortable playing defender and midfielder, Wellenberg was born in Deventer and made his debut in the professional football squad of Go Ahead Eagles in the 2001–02 season. Before, he had played amateur football with Rohda Raalte. He joined Twente in 2004.

On 13 July 2009, it was announced that Wellenberg had signed a three-year deal with NEC. In Nijmegen, he often struggled with injuries. After his contract with NEC was not extended, Wellenberg announced his retirement from professional football in 2012.

Honours
Twente
 UEFA Intertoto Cup co-winner: 2006

References

1982 births
Living people
Dutch footballers
Rohda Raalte players
Go Ahead Eagles players
FC Twente players
NEC Nijmegen players
Footballers from Deventer
Eredivisie players
Eerste Divisie players
Association football midfielders